Ornitholaelaps is a genus of mites in the family Laelapidae.

Species
 Ornitholaelaps nidi Okereke, 1968

References

Laelapidae